The 2014 Ohio Valley Conference baseball tournament was held from May 21 through 25.  The top six regular season finishers met in the double-elimination tournament, held at The Ballpark at Jackson in Jackson, Tennessee.  Jacksonville State won the tournament for the fourth time, earning the conference's automatic bid to the 2014 NCAA Division I baseball tournament

Seeding and format
The top six teams are taken and seeded by conference winning percentage.  Teams then play a double-elimination tournament, with the top two seeds receiving a single bye.

Tiebreakers:
x- SIU Edwardsville wins 4 seed from 2–1 record vs. Morehead State.

Results

All-Tournament Team
The following players were named to the All-Tournament Team. Jacksonville State's entire pitching staff was given the MVP award.

References

Tournament
Ohio Valley Conference Baseball Tournament
Ohio Valley Conference baseball tournament
Ohio Valley Conference baseball tournament
Baseball in Tennessee
Sports in Jackson, Tennessee